David Vairelles (born 6 December 1977 in Essey-les-Nancy, France) is a French former professional footballer who played as a defender.

Vairelles is the cousin of Tony Vairelles.

His twin brother Ludovic Vairelles played in the lower French leagues, mostly for SAS Épinal.

References

External links
 
 

Living people
1977 births
French twins
Association football defenders
French footballers
AS Nancy Lorraine players
AS Beauvais Oise players
ES Troyes AC players
Amiens SC players
FC Gueugnon players
Ligue 2 players
Twin sportspeople